The 2018 Monterrey Open (also known as the 2018 Abierto GNP Seguros for sponsorship reasons) was a women's tennis tournament played on outdoor hard courts. It was the 10th edition of the Monterrey Open and an International tournament on the 2018 WTA Tour. It took place at the Club Sonoma in Monterrey, Mexico, from 2 to 8 April, 2018.

Points and prize money

Point distribution

Prize money 

*per team

Singles main draw entrants

Seeds 

1 Rankings as of 19 March 2018.

Other entrants 
The following players received wildcards into the main draw: 
  Victoria Rodriguez 
  Ana Sofía Sánchez 
  Renata Zarazúa 

The following players received entry from the qualifying draw:
  Usue Maitane Arconada 
  Marie Bouzková 
  Valentini Grammatikopoulou
  Dalila Jakupović

Withdrawals 
Before the tournament
  Sabine Lisicki → replaced by  Risa Ozaki
  Monica Niculescu → replaced by  Irina Falconi
  Anastasia Pavlyuchenkova → replaced by  Carol Zhao

During the tournament
  Lesia Tsurenko

Doubles main draw entrants

Seeds 

 Rankings as of March 19, 2018.

Other entrants 
The following pairs received wildcards into the doubles main draw:
  Jovana Jakšić /  Ana Sofía Sánchez
  Marcela Zacarías /  Renata Zarazúa

Withdrawals 
During the tournament
  Lesia Tsurenko

Champions

Singles 

  Garbiñe Muguruza def.  Tímea Babos, 3–6, 6–4, 6–3

Doubles 

  Naomi Broady /  Sara Sorribes Tormo def.  Desirae Krawczyk /  Giuliana Olmos, 3–6, 6–4, [10–8]

References

External links 
 Official website

2018 WTA Tour
2018
2018 in Mexican tennis
April 2018 sports events in Mexico